I band may refer to:

the obsolete I band radio frequency allocation
an infrared filter in the UBVRI photometric system